Eleventh Hour (originally titled Dark Matter) is a four-part British television series developed by Granada Television for ITV, created by writer Stephen Gallagher.

Plot
The show follows the adventures of Professor Ian Hood (originally Alan Hood), played by Patrick Stewart, a Special Advisor to the government's Joint Sciences Committee, who troubleshoots threats stemming from or targeting "scientific endeavour." He is joined by Rachel Young, played by Ashley Jensen, a Special Branch operative who acts primarily as his bodyguard, as Hood has made powerful enemies through his work. The first episode was broadcast on 19 January 2006.

Cast
 Patrick Stewart as Professor Ian Hood
 Ashley Jensen as DS Rachel Young, Special Branch operative

Production
When Eleventh Hour went into pre-production in April 2005, it raised considerable interest and media attention, both because of Stewart's involvement and the budget allocated to the series by ITV, which was reportedly around £4.5 million. Gallagher, himself a two-time writer for Doctor Who, made the distinction that Eleventh Hour will be "science-based," not science fiction or speculative fiction.

Changing crew
Material was added to the scripts by producer Simon Stephenson after the early episodes went into production, and creator Stephen Gallagher left his role on the series because of it. Gallagher claimed that the reason behind his departure was because his essentially "science-based crime-drama" had unwanted sci-fi material written into it without his consent. The subject matter and direction of the later stories appear to differ from synopsis that were originally announced in April 2005.

Episodes

Home media
The complete series was released on Region 1 DVD on 26 September 2006. It was re-released on 24 May 2016 with new cover artwork, additional features and subtitles.

Remakes

An American remake, produced by Jerry Bruckheimer and starring Rufus Sewell as Hood (now known as Jacob Hood), aired on CBS from 2008 to 2009. American actress Marley Shelton co-starred as FBI Special Agent Rachel Young. The series aired on Thursdays at 10 pm (ET/PT). The remake was a joint venture between Jerry Bruckheimer Television, Granada Television International and Warner Bros. Television.

References
Notes

Bibliography

External links
 
 An early draft of the pilot screenplay

2000s British drama television series
2006 British television series debuts
2006 British television series endings
ITV television dramas
British thriller television series
Television series about cloning
English-language television shows
Television series by ITV Studios
Television shows produced by Granada Television